Hinderk "Henk" Bleker (born 26 July 1953) is a retired Dutch politician and jurist who served as State Secretary for Economic Affairs, Agriculture and Innovation in the First Rutte cabinet from 14 October 2010 to 5 November 2012. A member of the Christian Democratic Appeal (CDA), he previously was party chair from 20 June 2010 until 14 October 2010.

Decorations

References

External links 

Official
  Dr. H. (Henk) Bleker Parlement & Politiek

 

1953 births
Living people
Chairmen of the Christian Democratic Appeal
Christian Democratic Appeal politicians
Dutch corporate directors
Dutch management consultants
Dutch nonprofit directors
Dutch jurists
Dutch public broadcasting administrators
Knights of the Order of Orange-Nassau
Members of the Provincial Council of Groningen
Members of the Provincial-Executive of Groningen
Protestant Church Christians from the Netherlands
People from Stadskanaal
People from Vlagtwedde
State Secretaries for Agriculture of the Netherlands
State Secretaries for Economic Affairs of the Netherlands
Reformed Churches Christians from the Netherlands
University of Groningen alumni
Academic staff of the University of Groningen
Vrije Universiteit Amsterdam alumni
20th-century Dutch civil servants
20th-century Dutch politicians
21st-century Dutch politicians